Charles William Burke (born October 8, 1930) is an American speed skater. He competed at the 1952 Winter Olympics and the 1956 Winter Olympics.

References

External links
 

1930 births
Living people
American male speed skaters
Olympic speed skaters of the United States
Speed skaters at the 1952 Winter Olympics
Speed skaters at the 1956 Winter Olympics
Speed skaters from Chicago